Shop 'til You Drop is an American game show that was on the air intermittently between 1991 and 2005. Four different series were produced during that time, with the first premiering on Lifetime on July 8, 1991, and the fourth series airing its final episode on May 27, 2005, on PAX TV.

Pat Finn hosted the first three editions of Shop 'til You Drop, beginning in 1991 and ending in 2002. The announcers for those series were Mark L. Walberg, who announced from 1991 to 1994 and served as an on-air assistant, Jason Grant Smith, who was the original announcer for the second series in 1996 and 1997, and Dee Bradley Baker, who announced and co-hosted from 1997 to 1998 and again from 2000 until 2002.

The fourth series, which saw the show undergo a significant overhaul and format switch, was hosted by JD Roberto with Don Priess announcing.

Gameplay

Original series
The backdrop of gameplay was a two-story shopping mall containing 14 stores. Two teams each consisting of two people (almost always male-female, married, engaged, dating, siblings, or best friends) competed against each other to win prizes and a trip.

Stunt rounds
Nearly all of the stunts were mini-games played in a one-minute time limit, which tested popular culture and consumer knowledge. The winners of a coin toss followed the host to the play area of the first stunt. After being told the specific gameplay, the team decided whether to play the stunt or pass and force their opponents to play. Stunts varied widely, but most involved the team answering questions based upon a pop culture category, or various other games based on pricing merchandise.

Successfully completing the stunt earned points (100 in round one, 200 in round two) and allowed the team to choose a store located on the first floor of the mall, winning a prize associated with that store. Although the stores and prize specialty associated with each store varied from episode to episode, each generally featured prizes typical of game shows (furniture, electronics, artwork, etc.). One of the stores each day featured the "Shopper's Special", which also awarded a mini vacation if chosen.

After the first stunt was played, the remaining team played the second stunt. Whichever team did not have the choice of playing or passing the first stunt in round one had the option in round two.

Shopper's Challenge Round
The "Shopper's Challenge Round" was played after round two. During the round, the host asked a series of rapid-fire multiple-choice questions, again related to entertainment and shopping. The round was played for a 90-second time limit, and a correct answer awarded 50 points. Only one team member could answer each question, and partners switched places after a question was asked. If a team responded incorrectly, their opponents were given the chance to answer.

The team with the most points at the end of the round won the game and advanced to the bonus round. If a tie occurred, a final question was asked. A team who buzzed-in and answered correctly advanced to the bonus round. If a team answered incorrectly, the other team automatically won the game.

Shop 'til You Drop Round
The bonus round involved a shopping spree in which the team tried to accumulate a prize package of at least $2,500 within 90 seconds. One of the team members was the shopper while the other team member was the runner.

The shopper stood in front of a table with six boxes, each concealing a prize. When the round began, the shopper opened the first box and decided whether or not to keep the prize. If the prize was kept, the runner brought the box to a table across the stage and rang a bell signaling the shopper to open the next box. If the shopper wanted to exchange the prize, the runner took the box to any of the 14 stores in the mall, left the opened item there and brought the unopened box from the new store to the prize table and rang the bell. Play continued until six items were kept/exchanged, or until time ran out. At least one of the stores in the mall contained a prize worth at least $700.

Once the first half of the round was completed, the retail values of the prizes on the table were added one-by-one. If the total of the prizes reached or exceeded $2,500, the couple also won a trip. Regardless of the outcome, the couple kept all prizes that were placed on the table prior to time expiring, as well as any prizes won during the first two rounds of gameplay.

Changes

Lifetime version
During the first season of the Lifetime version, stunts similar to those on Beat the Clock (such as the female partner stuffing a certain number of balloons into a pair of oversized trousers worn by her husband without breaking any) were also played in the first two rounds. Some early stunts were played with a 30-, 45-, or (rarely) 90-second time limit.

During the show's first season, in order to win the trip, the team only needed to obtain $1,000 in prizes during the Shop 'til You Drop Round. Also, in the first season, there was always at least one store which featured a prize worth $500 or more. In addition, some of the boxes contained gag gifts, which were typically worth less than $50. Later in the first season, there were always at least two stores which featured prizes worth $300 or more. The gag gifts were eliminated when the goal was raised to $2,500 at the start of the second season.

2003 changes
In the third season of the PAX version that began airing in 2003, gameplay centered around a 14-department warehouse store (similar to stores like Costco, Sam's Club, and BJ's) instead of a shopping mall. While teams were still often composed of opposite-gender couples in a relationship, teams also included two friends of the same or opposite gender. Stunts were replaced with questions and pricing segments based upon specific topics, which were puns relating to their content. Instead of physical props, on-screen graphics were used to display the options to the home audience. The host provided the category for the segment and the first team chose to play or pass to their opponents. All segments were played within a 60-second time limit, and only one player could answer for each team. As with the original format, completing the challenge earned 100 points in round one and 200 points in round two.

After each completed challenge, as before, the team would win a prize of their choice. To choose, the other member of the team would run into the store and pick up a gift box from one department, then run it back to the gameplay area. Each department had a sign with a blue light on it, but the teams could only take from departments where the lights were flashing. The Shopper's Special was still attached to one of the prizes.

Round three, the "Shopper's Challenge" round, remained the same as in previous versions.

For the Shop 'til You Drop Round, team members alternated roles instead of one defined as the shopper and the other as the runner. One team member opened a box and the other handed the item off to their partner, who decided whether to keep or exchange the item for any prize in a department with a flashing light, then brought the associated box to a table and rang a bell. That team member then came back and handed off the next item to their teammate, who repeated the process. The 90-second time limit and $2,500 goal remained the same.

Broadcast history
Shop 'til You Drop aired on Lifetime from July 8, 1991, to September 30, 1994, with reruns airing until May 31, 1996. The show was produced by Stephen Brown. On June 17, 2015, GSN began airing reruns of this version, starting with episodes from 1993.

On December 19, 1993, a one-hour Christmas special aired featuring celebrities playing for charity. Four teams competed instead of two, and gameplay was modified so that after the stunt round, the two lower-scoring teams were eliminated and the remaining two teams competed in the Shoppers' Challenge Round to determine a winner, where each correct answer was worth $500 and the time limit was increased to two minutes. Teams also played for money instead of points. In the Shop 'til You Drop round, the target was raised to $5,000 with a $10,000 bonus for reaching or exceeding that goal.

In 1996, The New Shop 'til You Drop was developed for The Family Channel as part of its afternoon game show block. The revival debuted on September 30, 1996, and ran until August 14, 1998.

Reruns of the 1996 series, as well as of the final season of the Lifetime edition, aired on PAX TV from April 5, 1999, until March 31, 2000, as part of an hour block of game show reruns with the final season of Supermarket Sweep. GSN reran the entire 1997–98 season in 2015.

Pleased with the popularity of the reruns, PAX commissioned a new Shop 'til You Drop series that began airing on April 3, 2000. This series ran for two seasons and ended on May 24, 2002. Reruns of this 2000 series were picked up by GSN and began airing on December 2, 2013.

The warehouse store edition of Shop 'til You Drop premiered on October 6, 2003, and ran until May 27, 2005. Reruns continued until August 11, 2006, by which time PAX had been rebranded as i: Independent Television (later changed to Ion Television).

References

External links
 
 Official website of STYD
 
 Official website from WMS Gaming, which created the Shop 'til You Drop video slot machine

Lifetime (TV network) original programming
PAX TV original programming
1990s American game shows
1991 American television series debuts
1994 American television series endings
1996 American television series debuts
1998 American television series endings
2000s American game shows
2000 American television series debuts
2005 American television series endings
Television series by Stone Stanley Entertainment
Television shows filmed in Los Angeles
The Family Channel (American TV network, founded 1990) original programming
English-language television shows
American television series revived after cancellation